Suhel Nafar is currently the Vice President of Strategy & Market Development- WANA at Empire Distribution, the leading independent label, distributor, and publisher in the US and the first label to open a division in the US to help grow the local scene in West Asia & North Africa and its diaspora.

Most recently, Nafar worked at Spotify as the Global Lead of Arab Music & Culture helping to build and launch in West Asia and North Africa, including an initiative of international curation for the largest cultures in the world. Nafar also built Spotify's Arab Culture Hub and its international programming strategy, curating more than 120 playlists including flagship playlists such as Yalla Today's Top Hits, Arab X, Shisha Lounge and Global X. Additionally, in 2016 he helped launch Complex Snapchat Discover channel, the fastest growing platform in the history of Complex Networks.

In the 90s Nafar co-founded the Hip Hop crew, DAM (band), the first Arab Hip-Hop group out of West Asia. In 2016 was an artist-in-residence at New York University.

Suhel story was featured in the award-winning documentary, Slingshot Hip Hop, which premiered at the 2008 Sundance Film Festival and made its broadcast debut on the Sundance Channel. His films have been featured internationally including at the Mori Art Museum, Japan; TIFF Kids International Film Festival; Alfilm, Berlin; La Matatena, Mexico and the Asiana International Short Film Festival. 

Filmography
 Junction 48 (narrative feature) - story development, co-producer, motion graphics, 2015
 Law Arjaa Bil Zaman (If I Could Go Back in Time) (musical short film) - director, 2012
 Arab American Stories (PBS TV series) - animator, cinematographer, 2012
 The Adi Khalifa Show (comedy show) - director, 2012
 Yala to the Moon (short film) - animator, director, director of photography, 2011 
 Green revolution (music video) - cinematographer, director, 2011
 Habibi Rasak Kharban (feature film) - actor, 2010 
 Checkpoint Rock (music documentary) - narrator, talent, 2009
 Letters Mahmood (music video) - director, director of photography, 2009
 Letters Tamer (music video) - director, director of photography, 2009
 Slingshot Hip Hop (documentary feature) - narrator, cinematographer, talent, 2008
 My Lady (music video) - talent, 2007
 Forgiveness (feature film) - talent, 2006
 Born Here (music video) - talent, 2005

Film soundtracks 
 Junction 48, 2016
 Time Out of Mind
 Art/Violence, 2013
 Yala to the Moon, 2011
 Slingshot Hip Hop, 2009
 Checkpoint Rock, 2009 
 Where in the World Is Osama bin Laden?, 2009
 Salt of the Sea, 2008
 Forgiveness, 2006
 Local Angel, 2003
 Ford Transit, 2002

Discography

 Untouchables / Stop Selling Drugs, 1999
 Who's the terrorist (Meen Irhabi?), 2000
 Ihda', 2006
 Dabke on the Moon, 2013

Awards

Junction 48 
 Audience award at Berlin International Film Festival 
 Best International Narrative Feature at Tribeca Film Festival

Slingshot Hip Hop 
 “Documentary Competition” Sundance Film Festival 2008 
 “Audience Award: Best Documentary“ Films de Femmes, France 
 “Audience Award: Best Film“ DOX BOX Film Festival, Syria 
 “Best Director” Beirut International Film festival, Lebanon 
 “Audience Award: Best Film“ Beirut International Film festival, Lebanon  
 “Jury Prize” Festival Cinéma et Politique de Tours, Paris, France 
 “Silver Hanoman Prize” JAFF film festival, Indonesia 
 “Best Mediterranean Film” Granada Festival Cine del Sur, Spain 
 “Audience Award: Best Documentary” Cairo Refugee Film Festival, Egypt 
 “Audience Award: Best Film” Cairo Refugee Film Festival, Egypt 
 “Most Anticipated Film” Cairo Refugee Film Festival, Egypt 
 “Audience Award: Best Film“ Toronto Palestine Film Festival, Canada 
 “The Festival des Libertés Award” Festival des Libertés festival in Brussels, Belgium 
 "Aloha Accolade Winner" Honolulu Film Festival, Hawaii 
 “Audience Award: Best Film“ Arabian Sights/Washington DC Int Film Festival 
 Top 3 finalist for the IDFA - “DOC U” competition

References

External links
EMPIRE Expands in West-Asia north Africa
billboard International Power Players
Spotify lead of Arab music and culture
Spotify in MENA
Spotify Taps Palestinian Artist Suhel Nafar
Spotify Taps Palestinian Artist Suhel Nafar To Develop Arab Music & Culture Hub

Year of birth missing (living people)
Living people